Como is the surname of the following people:
Anna Como (fl. 1775), Danish ballerina
Anthony Como (born 1974), American politician
Emanuele da Como (1625–1701), Italian painter
James Como, American writer
Martino da Como, 15th-century Italian culinary expert 
Perry Como (1912–2001), American singer, actor and television personality
Rossella Como (1939–1986), Italian actress and television personality
Vincent Como (born 1975), American visual artist
William Como (1925–1989), American journalist and magazine editor